My Official Wife is a 1926 silent film by Austrian director Paul L. Stein, and his first American film. It stars Irene Rich and Conway Tearle. It is an adaptation of the 1891 novel My Official Wife by Richard Henry Savage (which had been filmed once before in 1914 by the Vitagraph Company of America with Clara Kimball Young as the lead), but the storyline was updated to include World War I.

Cast

Reception
Reviews were extremely mixed. Film Daily compiled newspaper review quotes upon the film's release (as it did for many releases), citing the New York American as stating it was "repulsive ... players are badly miscast." The Daily News called it "worth going to see ... well acted, well directed and nicely dressed up bit of screen hokum." The Evening World called it a "matinee picture for unhurried chocolate munchers ... too long and too slow moving," and the Morning Telegraph dubbed it "first rate entertainment ... our interest never for one moment lagged."

According to Warner Bros records the film earned $219,000 domestically and $96,000 foreign.

See also
 My Official Wife (1914 film)
 Escapade (1936 film)

References

Bibliography

External links

1926 films
Films directed by Paul L. Stein
American silent feature films
American black-and-white films
1920s English-language films
1920s American films